JCUKEN (ЙЦУКЕН, also known as YCUKEN, YTsUKEN and JTSUKEN) is the main Cyrillic keyboard layout for the Russian language in computers and typewriters. Earlier in Russia JIUKEN (ЙІУКЕН) layout was the main layout, but it was replaced by JCUKEN when the Russian alphabet reform of 1917 removed the letters Ѣ, І, Ѵ, and Ѳ. The letter Ъ had decreased in usage significantly after the reform.

Alternative layouts include the Russian phonetic keyboard layouts, in which Cyrillic letters correspond to similar-sounding Latin letters in QWERTY and other layouts.

JCUKEN

PC

Typewriters 
Used on typewriters before personal computers. It is available in Microsoft Windows  as a legacy layout.

JIUKEN 
The JIUKEN layout was used before the Russian spelling reform of 1918. It includes the Cyrillic dotted or "decimal" I as well as yat, which were eliminated after the reform, but it does not include the letters fita and izhitsa, which were rare even before the reform. The numbers 1, 3 and 0 do not appear on the layout and were replaced with the decimal I, Ze, and O respectively. The letters Ц and Э are located side-by-side, and between the Che and the Es is the yat. The letter yo is not included in this layout.

Other languages 
JCUKEN is the basis for many other Cyrillic layouts. For the current moment  Microsoft Windows supports the following layouts: Azerbaijani (Cyrillic), Bashkir, Belarusian, Kazakh, Kyrgyz, Mongolian, Tajik, Ukrainian, Uzbek (Cyrillic), Yakut (Sakha). The Belarusian, Ukrainian and Mongolian layouts have been available since Windows 95; Azeri, Kazakh, Kyrgyz, Tatar, Uzbek since Windows XP; Bashkir and Tajik since Windows Vista; Yakut since Windows 7.

Other operating systems such as Linux may have their own additional custom layouts for the same or other languages.

Belarusian 
The short U (Ў ў) is located in place of the shcha (Щ щ). It is the only JCUKEN keyboard that lacks a key for И, as it is the only language in the Cyrillic script that does not contain the letter И itself; the decimal I (І і) replaces it. It also lacks a hard sign (Ъ ъ), usually seen just to the right of letter ha (Х х) as that position is taken by the Apostrophe.

Ukrainian 
The decimal I replaces the yeru (Ы ы) and the yest (Є є) replaces the E (Э э). The letter Yi (Ї ї) substitutes for the hard sign (Ъ ъ), and Ghe with upturn (Ґ ґ) is also used.

Tatar 
This layout is also suitable for Kalmyk and Turkmen (Cyrillic) as their alphabets are practically identical to Tatar. It is called as YÖUKEN.

Bashkir

Kazakh

Kyrgyz 
Thus,  + У is Ү,  + О is Ө, and  + Н is Ң.

Yakut (Sakha)

Tajik 
This is a modified version of JCUKEN called YQUKEN, in which the Ka with descender (Қ қ) substitutes the C (Ц ц). The yeru (Ы ы) is replaced by the letter Che with descender (Ҷ ҷ). Also, the soft sign (Ь ь) is replaced by the I with macron (Ӣ ӣ). Further, the Kha with descender (Ҳ ҳ), the U with macron (Ӯ ӯ), and the ghayn (Ғ ғ) are used. (In Unicode, Kha with descender is known as "Ha with descender".)

Uzbek 
The short U substitutes the shcha, like the Belarusian keyboard (see above), and the ka with descender substitutes the yery. Moreover, the letter ghayn substitutes the minus sign and the underscore, while the kha with descender substitutes the plus sign and equal sign.

Azerbaijani 
This layout is a modified version called the JÜUKEN, and includes the Che with vertical stroke, shha, Ka with vertical stroke, and the Je. It is the only JCUKEN without the usual Й, as the language lacks the glyph, which was replaced by Je in 1958.

Substitutions to this keyboard are: having the schwa replacing the ya, the oe replacing the yu, the ghayn replacing the soft sign, the Che with vertical stroke replacing the hard sign, the ue replacing the tsa and the shha replacing the shcha.

Mongolian 
The Mongolian keyboard uses a modified version of JCUKEN, called FCUZHEN (ФЦУЖЭН), where letters specific to Russian are replaced by letters that see more use in Mongolian.

Other Cyrillic layouts

Serbian 
The Serbian keyboard called LJNJERTZ (ЉЊЕРТЗ), where letters of Serbian language was used instead of Russian letters. It lacks the yers and yeru (Ъ ъ, Ь ь and Ы ы), Э, and Ё. It is based on the QWERTZ keyboard.

Macedonian 
Also utilizing a modification of the Serb-style LJNJERTZ (LJNJERTDZ), a single "dead key" is used for input for Macedonian letters Gje «Ѓ ѓ» and Kje «Ќ ќ», as well as the typewritten apostrophe (in combination with the «spacebar»): «м. к. á», «К к» → «Ќ ќ», «м. к. á», «space» → «'».

Macedonian keyboard layouts under Microsoft Windows (KBDMAC.DLL and KBDMACST.DLL) do not use "dead keys". Instead, letters Gje and Kje are present as dedicated keys, and AltGr is used to access additional letters and punctuation.

Bulgarian 
Standard Bulgarian keyboard from 2006 (YUEIShSht)

Phonetic Cyrillic keyboard layout for Bulgarian in 2006 (Also known as "ЧШЕРТЪ" ChShert).

Latin JCUKEN 
This was the predominant layout on the Soviet-made microcomputers during the 1980s - the Cyrillic characters on most keys being supplemented with their Latin equivalents, and punctuation filling gaps where no direct Latin equivalent exists.

See also 
QWERTY

References 

Keyboard layouts
Russian language